X10p is a series of three-car electric multiple units operated by Greater Stockholm Transport (SL) on the Stockholm urban rail network called Roslagsbanan. The  gauged line cannot use the standard gauge rolling stock used in the rest of Stockholm, so SL ordered 35 new units to replace much older stock. Since 1995 X10p has been the sole stock used on Roslagsbanan. 

All X10p trains received a mid-life refurbishment by Euromaint in Solna between 2011 and 2013, and they will be complemented with newer Stadler Rail X15p trains starting from 2022.

References

External links
Järnväg.net on X10p 
Swetramway on X10p 

ABB multiple units
Rail transport in Stockholm
X10p
891 mm gauge railways in Sweden
1500 V DC multiple units
Adtranz multiple units